Paulo Roberto Rocha usually known as Paulinho or Paulinho Criciúma (born on August 30, 1961 in Criciúma) is a former football (soccer) player and a football head coach.

Club career
During his football career, he played as a center-forward. He represented Criciúma, where he started his career, between 1976 and 1982, América-SP in 1983, Bangu in 1984, POSCO Atoms of South Korea in 1985 and 1986 (League 28 matches-9 goals / League Cup 12 matches-3 goals), then returned to Bangu AC in 1987, signed with Botafogo in 1988, and left the club in 1990, In 1991, he played for Internacional, moving to Toyota Motor FC of Japan in the same year, staying in the Japanese club until 1992. In 1993, Paulinho Criciúma signed with the United States club Los Angeles Salsa which played in the American Professional Soccer League. Paulinho Criciúma was the league's points and goals leader, being named a first team All Star and the league MVP.  In 1994, he tied teammate Paul Wright for the points lead, but finished second on the goals list.  The Salsa folded at the end of the 1994 season and he moved north to the Montreal Impact of Canada.  The fall of 1995, Paulinho Criciúma signed with Atlético Celaya of Mexico, playing until 1996.

Paulinho Criciúma won the Korean Super League in 1986, representing POSCO Atoms, the Campeonato Carioca in 1989 and in 1990 with Botafogo, and the Konica Cup in 1991, with Toyota Motor FC.

Managerial career
He was the head coach of Barreiras in 2001, Camaçari in 2002, and was hired as Criciúma's head coach for the 2006 season, but was sacked on January 23 of that year.

References
Enciclopédia do Futebol Brasileiro, Volume 2 - Lance, Rio de Janeiro: Aretê Editorial S/A, 2001.

External links
 

1961 births
Living people
People from Criciúma
Association football forwards
Brazilian footballers
Brazilian expatriate footballers
Criciúma Esporte Clube players
América Futebol Clube (SP) players
Bangu Atlético Clube players
Pohang Steelers players
Botafogo de Futebol e Regatas players
Sport Club Internacional players
Nagoya Grampus players
Los Angeles Salsa players
Montreal Impact (1992–2011) players
Atlético Celaya footballers
K League 1 players
Japan Soccer League players
American Professional Soccer League players
Expatriate footballers in South Korea
Expatriate footballers in Japan
Expatriate soccer players in the United States
Expatriate footballers in Mexico
Expatriate soccer players in Canada
Brazilian expatriate sportspeople in South Korea
Brazilian expatriate sportspeople in Japan
Brazilian expatriate sportspeople in the United States
Brazilian expatriate sportspeople in Canada
Brazilian expatriate sportspeople in Mexico
Brazilian football managers
Camaçari Futebol Clube managers
Criciúma Esporte Clube managers
Sportspeople from Santa Catarina (state)